Jorge S. Aguirre Martín (11 February 1925 – 14 July 2005) was a Mexican athlete. He competed in the men's long jump and men's triple jump at the 1948 Summer Olympics, and placed fifth in the triple jump at the 1951 Pan American Games.

References

1925 births
2005 deaths
Mexican male long jumpers
Mexican male triple jumpers
Olympic athletes of Mexico
Athletes (track and field) at the 1948 Summer Olympics
Pan American Games competitors for Mexico
Athletes (track and field) at the 1951 Pan American Games
Athletes (track and field) at the 1955 Pan American Games